The Kanavinsky constituency (No.132) is a Russian legislative constituency in Nizhny Novgorod Oblast. Until 2007 the constituency covered Kanavinsky, Moskovsky, Nizhegorodsky and Sormovsky City Districts of Nizhny Novgorod. In 2016 Kanavinsky constituency was stretched to the west to take parts of the dismantled Dzerzhinsk constituency.

Members elected

Election Results

1993

|-
! colspan=2 style="background-color:#E9E9E9;text-align:left;vertical-align:top;" |Candidate
! style="background-color:#E9E9E9;text-align:left;vertical-align:top;" |Party
! style="background-color:#E9E9E9;text-align:right;" |Votes
! style="background-color:#E9E9E9;text-align:right;" |%
|-
|style="background-color:"|
|align=left|Vadim Bulavinov
|align=left|Independent
|
|18.35%
|-
|style="background-color:"|
|align=left|Vladimir Yudin
|align=left|Independent
|
|10.27%
|-
|style="background-color:"|
|align=left|Valery Lisitsyn
|align=left|Independent
|
|8.52%
|-
|style="background-color:"|
|align=left|Aleksandr Perfilyev
|align=left|Independent
|
|8.30%
|-
|style="background-color:#0085BE"|
|align=left|Stanislav Smirnov
|align=left|Choice of Russia
|
|7.00%
|-
|style="background-color:"|
|align=left|Viktor Yelchev
|align=left|Communist Party
|
|6.18%
|-
|style="background-color:"|
|align=left|Igor Veletminsky
|align=left|Liberal Democratic Party
|
|5.09%
|-
|style="background-color:#DBB726"|
|align=left|Gennady Rumyantsev
|align=left|Democratic Party
|
|2.73%
|-
|style="background-color:"|
|align=left|Boris Chernov
|align=left|Agrarian Party
|
|1.83%
|-
|style="background-color:#E9E26E"|
|align=left|Sergey Kapterev
|align=left|Russian Democratic Reform Movement
|
|1.82%
|-
|style="background-color:#000000"|
|colspan=2 |against all
|
|21.10%
|-
| colspan="5" style="background-color:#E9E9E9;"|
|- style="font-weight:bold"
| colspan="3" style="text-align:left;" | Total
| 
| 100%
|-
| colspan="5" style="background-color:#E9E9E9;"|
|- style="font-weight:bold"
| colspan="4" |Source:
|
|}

1995

|-
! colspan=2 style="background-color:#E9E9E9;text-align:left;vertical-align:top;" |Candidate
! style="background-color:#E9E9E9;text-align:left;vertical-align:top;" |Party
! style="background-color:#E9E9E9;text-align:right;" |Votes
! style="background-color:#E9E9E9;text-align:right;" |%
|-
|style="background-color:"|
|align=left|Olga Beklemishcheva
|align=left|Yabloko
|
|18.24%
|-
|style="background-color:"|
|align=left|Vadim Bulavinov (incumbent)
|align=left|Independent
|
|11.09%
|-
|style="background-color:"|
|align=left|Andrey Klimentyev
|align=left|Independent
|
|9.82%
|-
|style="background-color:"|
|align=left|Aleksandr Malyshko
|align=left|Communist Party
|
|8.74%
|-
|style="background-color:#1A1A1A"|
|align=left|Sergey Polozkov
|align=left|Stanislav Govorukhin Bloc
|
|6.63%
|-
|style="background-color:"|
|align=left|Aleksandr Savin
|align=left|Independent
|
|3.94%
|-
|style="background-color:"|
|align=left|Viktor Chechevichkin
|align=left|Independent
|
|3.54%
|-
|style="background-color:"|
|align=left|Veniamin Zakharov
|align=left|Liberal Democratic Party
|
|3.00%
|-
|style="background-color:"|
|align=left|Nikolay Kruglov
|align=left|Our Home – Russia
|
|2.94%
|-
|style="background-color:#F5A222"|
|align=left|Oleg Kim
|align=left|Interethnic Union
|
|2.59%
|-
|style="background-color:#3A46CE"|
|align=left|Ilya Zaslavsky
|align=left|Democratic Choice of Russia – United Democrats
|
|2.45%
|-
|style="background-color:"|
|align=left|Vyacheslav Kronsky
|align=left|Independent
|
|2.24%
|-
|style="background-color:#F21A29"|
|align=left|Vladislav Trubnikov
|align=left|Trade Unions and Industrialists – Union of Labour
|
|1.98%
|-
|style="background-color:"|
|align=left|Yevgeny Sabashnikov
|align=left|Independent
|
|1.92%
|-
|style="background-color:#D50000"|
|align=left|Pyotr Tipakov
|align=left|Communists and Working Russia - for the Soviet Union
|
|1.85%
|-
|style="background-color:#019CDC"|
|align=left|Irina Mikhaylovskaya
|align=left|Party of Russian Unity and Accord
|
|1.78%
|-
|style="background-color:#CE1100"|
|align=left|Vladimir Yudin
|align=left|My Fatherland
|
|1.53%
|-
|style="background-color:"|
|align=left|Vladimir Khvorostukhin
|align=left|Independent
|
|1.46%
|-
|style="background-color:#0D0900"|
|align=left|Anatoly Mitrofanov
|align=left|People's Union
|
|0.97%
|-
|style="background-color:#00A200"|
|align=left|Viktor Chumak
|align=left|Transformation of the Fatherland
|
|0.64%
|-
|style="background-color:#000000"|
|colspan=2 |against all
|
|9.68%
|-
| colspan="5" style="background-color:#E9E9E9;"|
|- style="font-weight:bold"
| colspan="3" style="text-align:left;" | Total
| 
| 100%
|-
| colspan="5" style="background-color:#E9E9E9;"|
|- style="font-weight:bold"
| colspan="4" |Source:
|
|}

1999

|-
! colspan=2 style="background-color:#E9E9E9;text-align:left;vertical-align:top;" |Candidate
! style="background-color:#E9E9E9;text-align:left;vertical-align:top;" |Party
! style="background-color:#E9E9E9;text-align:right;" |Votes
! style="background-color:#E9E9E9;text-align:right;" |%
|-
|style="background-color:"|
|align=left|Vadim Bulavinov
|align=left|Independent
|
|28.62%
|-
|style="background-color:"|
|align=left|Olga Beklemishcheva (incumbent)
|align=left|Yabloko
|
|17.27%
|-
|style="background-color:"|
|align=left|Vladimir Pachenov
|align=left|Independent
|
|14.84%
|-
|style="background-color:#3B9EDF"|
|align=left|Olga Noskova
|align=left|Fatherland – All Russia
|
|8.52%
|-
|style="background-color:"|
|align=left|Aleksandr Kosovskikh
|align=left|Independent
|
|3.08%
|-
|style="background-color:#FF4400"|
|align=left|Sergey Speransky
|align=left|Andrey Nikolayev and Svyatoslav Fyodorov Bloc
|
|3.00%
|-
|style="background-color:"|
|align=left|Vladimir Kozlov
|align=left|Independent
|
|2.61%
|-
|style="background-color:"|
|align=left|Valery Goltsev
|align=left|Independent
|
|2.48%
|-
|style="background-color:#D50000"|
|align=left|Pyotr Tipakov
|align=left|Communists and Workers of Russia - for the Soviet Union
|
|1.52%
|-
|style="background-color:"|
|align=left|Tamara Davletshina
|align=left|Liberal Democratic Party
|
|0.94%
|-
|style="background-color:#FCCA19"|
|align=left|Aleksey Svetlichny
|align=left|Congress of Russian Communities-Yury Boldyrev Movement
|
|0.75%
|-
|style="background-color:"|
|align=left|Yury Sedov
|align=left|Our Home – Russia
|
|0.74%
|-
|style="background-color:#000000"|
|colspan=2 |against all
|
|14.03%
|-
| colspan="5" style="background-color:#E9E9E9;"|
|- style="font-weight:bold"
| colspan="3" style="text-align:left;" | Total
| 
| 100%
|-
| colspan="5" style="background-color:#E9E9E9;"|
|- style="font-weight:bold"
| colspan="4" |Source:
|
|}

2003

|-
! colspan=2 style="background-color:#E9E9E9;text-align:left;vertical-align:top;" |Candidate
! style="background-color:#E9E9E9;text-align:left;vertical-align:top;" |Party
! style="background-color:#E9E9E9;text-align:right;" |Votes
! style="background-color:#E9E9E9;text-align:right;" |%
|-
|style="background-color:"|
|align=left|Lyubomir Tyan
|align=left|United Russia
|
|27.71%
|-
|style="background-color:"|
|align=left|Vladimir Pachenov
|align=left|Communist Party
|
|13.47%
|-
|style="background-color:"|
|align=left|Aleksandr Bochkarev
|align=left|Independent
|
|12.65%
|-
|style="background-color:#1042A5"|
|align=left|Galina Klochkova
|align=left|Union of Right Forces
|
|5.88%
|-
|style="background-color:"|
|align=left|Aleksandr Kurdyumov
|align=left|Liberal Democratic Party
|
|5.33%
|-
|style="background-color:#00A1FF"|
|align=left|Vladimir Gorin
|align=left|Party of Russia's Rebirth-Russian Party of Life
|
|4.37%
|-
|style="background-color:"|
|align=left|Georgy Ivanov
|align=left|Independent
|
|3.18%
|-
|style="background-color:"|
|align=left|Vyacheslav Tarakanov
|align=left|Yabloko
|
|2.24%
|-
|style="background-color:"|
|align=left|Tatyana Platonova
|align=left|Independent
|
|1.02%
|-
|style="background-color:#164C8C"|
|align=left|Irina Boychenko
|align=left|United Russian Party Rus'
|
|0.52%
|-
|style="background-color:"|
|align=left|Denis Gogolev
|align=left|Independent
|
|0.34%
|-
|style="background-color:"|
|align=left|Vladimir Osin
|align=left|Independent
|
|0.27%
|-
|style="background-color:"|
|align=left|Mikhail Iosilevich
|align=left|Independent
|
|0.25%
|-
|style="background-color:"|
|align=left|Denis Gorbushin
|align=left|Independent
|
|0.19%
|-
|style="background-color:#000000"|
|colspan=2 |against all
|
|21.30%
|-
| colspan="5" style="background-color:#E9E9E9;"|
|- style="font-weight:bold"
| colspan="3" style="text-align:left;" | Total
| 
| 100%
|-
| colspan="5" style="background-color:#E9E9E9;"|
|- style="font-weight:bold"
| colspan="4" |Source:
|
|}

2016

|-
! colspan=2 style="background-color:#E9E9E9;text-align:left;vertical-align:top;" |Candidate
! style="background-color:#E9E9E9;text-align:left;vertical-align:top;" |Party
! style="background-color:#E9E9E9;text-align:right;" |Votes
! style="background-color:#E9E9E9;text-align:right;" |%
|-
|style="background-color:"|
|align=left|Vadim Bulavinov
|align=left|United Russia
|
|55.53%
|-
|style="background-color:"|
|align=left|Aleksandr Tarnayev
|align=left|Communist Party
|
|14.16%
|-
|style="background:"| 
|align=left|Anatoly Shein
|align=left|A Just Russia
|
|7.77%
|-
|style="background-color:"|
|align=left|Vladislav Atmakhov
|align=left|Liberal Democratic Party
|
|7.17%
|-
|style="background-color:"|
|align=left|Sergey Almayev
|align=left|Rodina
|
|4.63%
|-
|style="background:"| 
|align=left|Artur Yeranosyan
|align=left|Communists of Russia
|
|2.15%
|-
|style="background:"| 
|align=left|Andrey Khomov
|align=left|Yabloko
|
|2.13%
|-
|style="background:"| 
|align=left|Sergey Luzin
|align=left|Party of Growth
|
|1.59%
|-
| colspan="5" style="background-color:#E9E9E9;"|
|- style="font-weight:bold"
| colspan="3" style="text-align:left;" | Total
| 
| 100%
|-
| colspan="5" style="background-color:#E9E9E9;"|
|- style="font-weight:bold"
| colspan="4" |Source:
|
|}

2021

|-
! colspan=2 style="background-color:#E9E9E9;text-align:left;vertical-align:top;" |Candidate
! style="background-color:#E9E9E9;text-align:left;vertical-align:top;" |Party
! style="background-color:#E9E9E9;text-align:right;" |Votes
! style="background-color:#E9E9E9;text-align:right;" |%
|-
|style="background-color: " |
|align=left|Vadim Bulavinov (incumbent)
|align=left|United Russia
|86,454
|44.80%
|-
|style="background-color: " |
|align=left|Aleksandr Terentyev
|align=left|Communist Party
|45,932
|23.80%
|-
|style="background-color: " |
|align=left|Lyubov Soldatkina
|align=left|A Just Russia — For Truth
|17,253
|8.94%
|-
|style="background-color: " |
|align=left|Kirill Murygin
|align=left|New People
|12,427
|6.44%
|-
|style="background-color: " |
|align=left|Vladislav Atmakhov
|align=left|Liberal Democratic Party
|12,083
|6.26%
|-
|style="background-color: " |
|align=left|Dmitry Talnikov
|align=left|Party of Pensioners
|8,526
|4.42%
|-
|style="background-color: " |
|align=left|Sergey Neganov
|align=left|Party of Growth
|2,651
|1.37%
|-
| colspan="5" style="background-color:#E9E9E9;"|
|- style="font-weight:bold"
| colspan="3" style="text-align:left;" | Total
| 192,969
| 100%
|-
| colspan="5" style="background-color:#E9E9E9;"|
|- style="font-weight:bold"
| colspan="4" |Source:
|
|}

Notes

References 

Russian legislative constituencies
Politics of Nizhny Novgorod Oblast